Arumosam Wahi (Fancy Rains) is a 2002 Sri Lankan Sinhala children's drama film directed and produced by Priyantha Colombage with the funds of National Film Corporation of Sri Lanka. It stars Mahendra Perera and W. Jayasiri in lead roles along with Vasantha Vittachchi and Ajith Lokuge. Music composed by Samantha Perera, which was his maiden cinematic music direction. It is the 997th Sri Lankan film in the Sinhala cinema.

The film represented at Jakarta International Film Festival 2002 and 33rd Film Festival of India at New Delhi. The film was shot around Nachchidoowa in Anuradhapura. Ministry of Education approved the film as suitable for school children.

In January 2003, a controversy arose when the film replaced with a cheap, erotic film at a theatre in Avissawella just after three days its release. Director claimed that the replacement was done even without the knowledge of National Film Corporation. The film was withdrawn from all the cinema theaters around the country on January 2 after 13 days of screening. However, the film was re-screened at National Film Corporation circuit cinemas from February 14. 2003.

Plot

Cast
 Mahendra Perera as Bindu
 W. Jayasiri as Circus manager
 Nuwangi Liyanage as Laila
 Vasantha Vittachchi
 Ajith Lokuge
 Sanet Dikkumbura
 Gnananga Gunawardena
 Saranapala Jayasuriya
 Bertie Nihal Susiripala
 Samantha Perera

Soundtrack

References

2002 films
2000s Sinhala-language films
Films set in Sri Lanka (1948–present)
2002 drama films
Sri Lankan drama films